Something Short of Paradise is a 1979 American romantic comedy film directed by David Helpern from a screenplay by Fred Barron. It stars Susan Sarandon and David Steinberg.

Plot
Madeleine Ross (Susan Sarandon) is a journalist, and her boyfriend, Harris Sloane (David Steinberg), is the owner of an art theatre.  Their relationship is on-again/off-again, and when Madeleine meets the French star Jean-Fidel Mileau (Jean-Pierre Aumont) it provokes changes in the way she and Harris feel about each other.

Cast
Susan Sarandon as	Madeline Ross
David Steinberg as Harris Sloane
Jean-Pierre Aumont as Jean-Fidel Mileau
Marilyn Sokol as Ruthie Miller
Joe Grifasi as Barney Collins
Robert Hitt as Edgar Kent
Terrence O'Hara as Donny Conrad

Production
Something Short of Paradise was shot in New York City, and was advertised with the tagline "Love isn't blind... just a little nearsighted!"

Release
The film premiered at the Toronto International Film Festival on September 14, 1979.

References

External links

1979 films
1979 romantic comedy films
American International Pictures films
Films scored by Mark Snow
Films about journalists
Films shot in New York City
1970s English-language films